The 2014 Australia Super Series was the eighth Super Series tournament of the 2014 BWF Super Series in badminton. The tournament was held in Sydney, Australia from 24–29 June 2014 with a total purse of $750,000.

Players by nation

Representatives by nation

Men's singles

Seeds 

  Jan Ø. Jørgensen 
  Kenichi Tago
  Tommy Sugiarto (semifinals)
  Shon Wan-ho (quarterfinals)
  Boonsak Ponsana (first round)
  Wang Zhengming (quarterfinals)
  Kento Momota (quarterfinals)
  Marc Zwiebler (second round)

Top half

Bottom half

Finals

Women's singles

Seeds 

  Wang Shixian (semifinals)
  Ratchanok Intanon (second round)
  Sung Ji-hyun (second round)
  Bae Yeon-ju (second round)
  Tai Tzu-ying (quarterfinals)
  Saina Nehwal (winner)
  Porntip Buranaprasertsuk (first round)
  Pusarla Venkata Sindhu (quarterfinals)

Top half

Bottom half

Finals

Men's doubles

Seeds 

  Mohammad Ahsan / Hendra Setiawan (withdrew)
  Kim Ki-jung / Kim Sa-rang (semifinals)
  Lee Sheng-mu / Tsai Chia-hsin (Runner Up)
  Lee Yong-dae / Yoo Yeon-seong (winner)
  Liu Xiaolong / Qiu Zihan (quarterfinals)
  Gideon Markus Fernaldi / Markis Kido (second round)
  Fu Haifeng / Zhang Nan (second round)
  Takeshi Kamura / Keigo Sonoda (first round)

Top half

Bottom half

Finals

Women's doubles

Seeds 

  Kamilla Rytter Juhl / Christinna Pedersen (semifinals)
  Misaki Matsutomo / Ayaka Takahashi (Runner Up)
  Jang Ye-na / Kim So-young (second round)
  Reika Kakiiwa / Miyuki Maeda (second round)
  Tian Qing / Zhao Yunlei (winner)
  Luo Ying / Luo Yu (semifinals)
  Jung Kyung-eun / Kim Ha-na (quarterfinals)
  Pia Zebadiah Bernadeth / Rizki Amelia Pradipta (second round)

Top half

Bottom half

Finals

Mixed doubles

Seeds 

  Tontowi Ahmad / Lilyana Natsir (withdrew)
  Xu Chen / Ma Jin (quarterfinals)
  Joachim Fischer Nielsen / Christinna Pedersen (first round)
  Markis Kido / Pia Zebadiah Bernadeth (semifinals)
  Sudket Prapakamol / Saralee Thoungthongkam (semifinals)
  Ko Sung-hyun / Kim Ha-na (winner)
  Lee Chun Hei / Chau Hoi Wah (first round)
  Shin Baek-cheol / Jang Ye-na (first round)

Top half

Bottom half

Finals

References 

Australian Open (badminton)
2014 BWF Super Series
Sports competitions in Sydney
2014 in Australian sport